

Meningie East is a locality in the Australian state of South Australia located about  south-east of the state capital of Adelaide and about  south-east of the municipal seat in Tailem Bend.

Meningie East ’s boundaries were created on 24 August 2000 and given the “local established name”.  Its southern boundary is the McIntosh Way, a sealed road connecting the towns of Meningie and Coonalpyn and which is maintained by the Government of South Australia.

Land use within the locality is ’primary production’.

The 2016 Australian census which was conducted in August 2016 reports that Meningie East had 14 people living within its boundaries.

Meningie East is located within the federal division of Barker, the state electoral district of Mackillop and the local government area of the Coorong District Council.

References

Towns in South Australia